The IAR 471 was a Romanian World War II prototype of ground attack aircraft and dive bomber aircraft built in 1943 by Industria Aeronautică Română (IAR).

Development
The IAR-81 had not proved a great success as an improvised dive bomber and experience with the IAR-47 showed that the IAR K14 would not be up to the demands of powering a full-sized dive bomber. Thus by early 1943 the Royal Romanian Air Force still lacked an effective ground support aircraft. In November 1942, IAR had at last secured a license for the manufacture of the German DB 605 engine and planning now centred on this powerplant. On January 16, 1943, a new dive bomber project, the IAR-471, was commissioned which was to be powered by the DB 605. Although the Germans lent Romania numerous Stukas from mid-1943, they would not sell any. Therefore, the design of the IAR-471 was persevered with for reasons of self-sufficiency.

Despite its designation, the IAR-471 bore little resemblance to the smaller IAR 47 and was essentially a different aircraft. It was designed with a superior performance to the Stuka, much helped by the retractable undercarriage, but a lighter bomb load, and on May 7, 1944, the Stuka's two underwing 37mm cannons were ordered to be included in its specification. It was planned to order 100 IAR-471s and 136 engines from IAR in 1944/1945, but IAR was in the throes of dispersing its factories and beginning production of the Bf 109G and declared itself incapable of simultaneously producing the IAR-471. This halted the project even before Romania's defection to the Allies on August 23, 1944. No prototype flew. There were (at least) one IAR 471 prototypes built.

Operators
 Kingdom of Romania
Royal Romanian Air Force

Specifications (IAR 471)

See also

References

 Axworthy, Max. "On Three Fronts: Romania's Aircraft Industry During World War Two". Air Enthusiast,  No.56, Winter 1994. Stamford, Lincs, UK: Key Publishing. ISSN 0143-5450. pp. 8–27.
 Morosanu, Teodor Liviu. "Romanian Reconnaissance". Air International, April 1994, Vol 46 No 4. Stamford, Lincs, UK: Key Publishing. ISSN 0306-5634. pp. 207–211.

1940s Romanian military reconnaissance aircraft
1940s Romanian bomber aircraft
1940s military reconnaissance aircraft
World War II Romanian reconnaissance aircraft